The following is a list of coaches who have coached the Australia national cricket team in international cricket matches and tournaments.

List of Australia men's national cricket coaches 
Prior to 1986, Australia did not select coaches as long-term appointments. Managers were appointed to handle the logistics of overseas tours and the assistant manager often doubled as the coach for the duration of the trip. Sometimes the team captain filled the Australian coaching role, particularly for home matches.

References

External links

Coaches,national